Pat Welsh is a retired Australian sports journalist and reporter. Welsh was currently a sport presenter on Seven News Brisbane.

Career 
In 1975, Welsh joined the Seven Network as a sports presenter and reporter. Pat is an Australian sports journalist, commentator, and sports editor.

Welsh is best known for his rugby league and golfing commentary, and has travelled extensively throughout Europe, Australia and the United States for the Seven Network. He has covered a wide array of events including the Bathurst 1000, Melbourne Cup, international rugby league, Summer Olympic Games (Barcelona, Atlanta, Sydney, Athens, Beijing, Rio), and Winter Olympic Games (Nagano, Salt Lake City, Torino).

Welsh began co-hosting the Breakfast with Pat & Heals breakfast program with former Australian cricketer Ian Healy on 7 September 2020, when SEN Track was launched in both North Queensland and South East Queensland.  The program was then also heard on new digital station SENQ in 2021. Welsh continued co-hosting the program when 693 SENQ launched on the 693 AM frequency in Brisbane on 1 July 2022, after the Sports Entertainment Network acquired the license of long running Brisbane music station 4KQ from the Australian Radio Network, a subsidiary of HT&E.

In January 2023, Welsh announced his resignation from the Seven Network after 47 years. Ben Davis will replace him as sports editor.

Personal life 
In June 2010, Welsh announced that he was engaged to Cecilynne Jurss.

Charity and advocacy 
In July 2013 Welsh was appointed an Ambassador for Alzheimer's Australia (QLD). This role transitioned to becoming a Dementia Australia Ambassador in October 2017 when the federation of Alzheimer's Australia unified into one organisation. At the time of accepting the role of Ambassador, Welsh said he was committed to raising brain health awareness and advocating for people with dementia in memory of his father.

References

Australian television journalists
Living people
Year of birth missing (living people)
Seven News presenters